The Bombardier CRJ or CRJ Series (for Canadair Regional Jet) is a family of regional jets introduced in 1991 by Bombardier Aerospace. The CRJ was formerly manufactured by Bombardier Aerospace with the manufacturing of the first CRJ generation, the CRJ100/200 (introduced in 1991) and the second CRJ generation, the CRJ700 series (introduced in 1999). The CRJ programme was acquired by Japanese corporation Mitsubishi Heavy Industries (MHI RJ Aviation Group) in a deal that closed 1 June 2020. Bombardier subsequently completed assembly of the order backlog on behalf of Mitsubishi.

Background
Bombardier claims it is the most successful family of regional jets in the world. By October 2018, 1,800 CRJs had been delivered. Production ended in December 2020 after 1,945 were built.

The family consists of the following aircraft generations and models/derivatives:
 CRJ100/200
 CL-600-2B19 (Regional Jet Series 100/200/440) – maximum of 50 passenger seats
 CRJ700 series
 CL-600-2C10 (Regional Jet Series 700/701/702), marketed as the CRJ700 - maximum of 78 passenger seats
 CL-600-2D15 (Regional Jet Series 705), marketed as the CRJ705 - maximum of 75 passenger seats 
 CL-600-2D24 (Regional Jet Series 900), marketed as the CRJ900 - maximum of 90 passenger seats
 CL-600-2E25 (Regional Jet Series 1000), marketed as the CRJ1000 - maximum of 104 passenger seats
 On February 6, 2019, Bombardier launched the CRJ550, based on the CRJ700, with 50 seats in three classes. The launch customer, United Airlines, ordered 50 aircraft configured with 10 first class, 20 Economy Plus and 20 economy seats, to be delivered later in 2019.

Divestment 
, following Bombardier's decisions to sell the CSeries to Airbus and the Q Series to Viking Air, the company was looking at "strategic options" to return the CRJ to profitability. Analysts suspected that it may decide to exit the commercial aircraft market altogether and refocus on business aircraft.

On 25 June 2019, a deal to sell the CRJ programme to Mitsubishi Heavy Industries, the parent company of Mitsubishi Aircraft Corporation which develops the SpaceJet, was announced. Mitsubishi had a historic interest in the CRJ programme, having sounded out risk-sharing options with Bombardier, and were at one point expected to take a stake in the venture during the 1990s. Bombardier has stopped taking new sales; production of the CRJ will continue at Mirabel until the current order backlog is complete, with final deliveries expected in the second half of 2020. The deal is to include the type certificate for the CRJ series; Bombardier is working with Transport Canada to separate the CRJ certificate from that of the Challenger.

Closure of the deal was confirmed on 1 June 2020, with Bombardier's service and support activities transferred to a new Montreal-based company, MHI RJ Aviation Group. MHI RJ has not renamed the aircraft, and its website refers simply to the CRJ Series.

The final Bombardier CRJ to be produced, a CRJ-900, finished production and was delivered to SkyWest Airlines on 28 February 2021.

Mitsubishi CRJ 
In 2021, Mitsubishi mooted restarting production on the CRJ-550, a variant of the CRJ-700 configured in the 50-seat class similar to the nominal seating capacity of the 100/200/440 models. This would involve building a new plant at Mirabel, Greater Montreal, Quebec, Canada; as the former plant is now making Airbus A220s; and taking the tooling out of storage. Possible future production of new built 700 and 900 series as well.

Specifications

References

External links
 

Set index articles on vehicles
Airliners